Qaleh-ye Olya (also Romanized as Qal‘eh-ye ‘Olyā; also known as Kaleh, Qal‘eh, Qal‘eh Bālā, and Qal‘eh-ye Bālā) is a village in Ujan-e Gharbi Rural District, in the Central District of Bostanabad County, East Azerbaijan Province, Iran. At the 2006 census, its population was 325, in 57 families.

References 

Populated places in Bostanabad County